The Waikoloa Championships was a WTA Tour tournament held in 2001 and 2002 in Waikoloa Village, Hawaiʻi. It was a Tier IV event and was played on outdoor hardcourts. Yearly prize money of the tournament was $140,000.

It was held at the same venue as the USTA Waikola Challenger, Kohala Tennis Garden.

Past finals

Singles

Doubles

Defunct tennis tournaments in the United States
Hard court tennis tournaments in the United States
Tennis in Hawaii
WTA Tour
Recurring sporting events established in 2001
Recurring sporting events disestablished in 2002
2001 establishments in Hawaii
2002 disestablishments in Hawaii